Eublemma trifasciata is a moth of the family Erebidae first described by Frederic Moore in 1881. It is found in Sri Lanka, India and Borneo.

References

Moths of Asia
Moths described in 1881
Boletobiinae